Chronicle of a Death Foretold is a 1981 novella by Gabriel García Márquez.

Chronicle of a Death Foretold may also refer to:
 Chronicle of a Death Foretold (film), a 1987 film directed by Francesco Rosi
 Chronicle of a Death Foretold (musical), a 1995 musical